All Dogs Go to Heaven is a 1989 animated musical fantasy adventure comedy-drama film directed by Don Bluth and co-directed by Gary Goldman (his directorial debut) and Dan Kuenster. It tells the story of Charlie B. Barkin (voiced by Burt Reynolds), a German Shepherd that is murdered by his former friend, Carface Carruthers (voiced by Vic Tayback, in one of his last roles). Charlie withdraws from his place in Heaven to return to Earth where his best friend, Itchy Itchiford (voiced by Dom DeLuise), still lives, in order to take revenge on Carface. Instead, he ends up befriending a young orphan girl named Anne-Marie (voiced by Judith Barsi in her final film role). In the process, Charlie learns an important lesson about kindness, friendship and love.

The film is an Irish, British and American venture, produced by Goldcrest Films and Sullivan Bluth Studios Ireland Ltd. On its cinema release, it competed directly with Walt Disney Feature Animation's The Little Mermaid, released on the same day. While it did not repeat the box-office success of Sullivan Bluth's previous features, An American Tail and The Land Before Time, it was successful on home video, becoming one of the biggest-selling VHS releases ever. It inspired a theatrical sequel, a television series, and a holiday direct-to-video film.

Plot 

In 1939 New Orleans, slightly good-natured but generally scheming Charles B. "Charlie" Barkin escapes from the dog pound where he was to be put down with the help of his best friend Itchy Itchiford and returns to their casino riverboat on the bayou, formerly run by Charlie himself and his business partner, Carface Caruthers. Refusing to share the profits with Charlie, Carface had been responsible for Charlie getting committed to the pound and persuades Charlie to leave town with half of the casino's earnings. Charlie agrees, but is later intoxicated during Mardi Gras and killed by a car pushed downhill by Carface and his assistant, Killer. Charlie is sent to Heaven by default despite not having done any good deeds in his life; a whippet angel explains to him that because dogs are inherently good and loyal, all dogs go to Heaven and are entitled to paradise. Charlie cheats death by stealing a gold pocket watch representing his life and winding it back. As Charlie descends back to Earth, the whippet angel tells him that he can never return to Heaven; when the watch stops again, he will be sent to Hell instead. However, as long as the watch continues to run, Charlie will be immortal.

After Charlie reunites with Itchy and plots revenge in the form of a rivaling business, they discover that Carface has kidnapped a young orphan girl named Anne-Marie for her ability to talk to animals, which proves advantageous when betting on races. Charlie rescues her and promises to feed the poor and help her find a family. The next day at the race track, Charlie steals a wallet from a couple as they talk to Anne-Marie and become alarmed by her ragged appearance. Charlie and Itchy use their winnings to build a successful casino in the junkyard where they live. Anne-Marie, upon realizing that she has been used, threatens to leave. To persuade her to stay, Charlie brings pizza to a family of poor puppies and their mother, Flo, at an abandoned church. While there, Anne-Marie becomes angry at Charlie for stealing the wallet. As Charlie has a nightmare in which he is condemned to Hell, Anne-Marie returns the wallet to the couple, Kate and Harold. While they privately discuss adopting her, Charlie arrives and tricks her into leaving with him. Charlie and Anne-Marie narrowly escape an ambush by Carface and Killer and hide in an abandoned building, but the ground breaks and they fall into the lair of King Gator, a giant effeminate alligator. He and Charlie bond over a love of music and he lets them go, but Anne-Marie contracts pneumonia.

Carface and his thugs destroy Charlie's casino and attack Itchy. Injured, Itchy limps back to the church and confronts Charlie about his relationship with Anne-Marie, who Itchy thinks matters more than him. In his exasperation, Charlie loudly proclaims that he is using her and will eventually "dump her in an orphanage". A heartbroken Anne-Marie overhears the conversation and tearfully runs away before she is kidnapped by Carface. Charlie follows them to Carface's casino, where he is ambushed by Carface and his thugs. They fight with Charlie, inadvertently setting an oil fire that soon engulfs the whole structure. Charlie's pained howls from their bites summon King Gator, who chases down and devours Carface. In the chaos, both Anne-Marie and the watch fall into the water. Unable to rescue both at the same time, Charlie rescues Anne-Marie, places her onto some driftwood and pushes her toward safety; however, the watch stops before he can reach it, ending his life, so Killer finishes pushing her to shore, where Kate and Harold are waiting with police and medical personnel.

Sometime later, Kate and Harold adopt Anne-Marie, who has also adopted Itchy. Charlie, having sacrificed himself to save Anne-Marie, has earned back his place in Heaven, and is allowed to return in ghost form to reconcile with Anne-Marie. Leaving Itchy in her care, Charlie returns to Heaven, where Carface finally arrives and takes his own watch, vowing revenge against King Gator. As the whippet angel chases him and warns against using it, Charlie assures the audience that "he'll be back" before retrieving his halo.

Voice cast 
 Burt Reynolds as Charlie B. Barkin, a brash German Shepherd and a former con artist. The character was designed specifically with Reynolds in mind for the role and the animators mimicked some of his mannerisms.
 Reynolds is succeeded by Charlie Sheen for All Dogs Go to Heaven 2, and Steven Weber for All Dogs Go to Heaven: The Series and An All Dogs Christmas Carol. Charlie was modeled after a German Shepherd, appropriately named Burt. Burt the dog often spent time with the animators at the studio, even going with them during the studio's move to Ireland.
 Dom DeLuise as Itchy Itchiford, a paranoid, anxious but loyal Dachshund.
 DeLuise reprised his role in All Dogs Go to Heaven 2, the series and An All Dogs Christmas Carol.
 Judith Barsi as Anne-Marie, a 7-year-old orphan girl with the ability to talk to and understand animals. Her singing voice was performed by Lana Beeson. This was Barsi's final film role before her murder in 1988. The end credits song "Love Survives" was dedicated in her memory as her character became absent in the further franchise.
 Vic Tayback as Carface Caruthers, a violent, sadistic mixed blue-nosed American Pit Bull Terrier/Bulldog gangster. This was Tayback's final film role before his death in 1990.
 For All Dogs Go to Heaven 2, All Dogs Go to Heaven: The Series and An All Dogs Christmas Carol, Ernest Borgnine took Tayback's role.
 Charles Nelson Reilly as Killer, a misnamed, fidgety, neurotic and spectacles-wearing Schnoodle who is Carface's comic relief sidekick.
 Reilly was the second original voice actor that reprised his role in the series and An All Dogs Christmas Carol except for the sequel.
 Loni Anderson as Flo, a female Rough Collie and Charlie's friend.
 Melba Moore as a Whippet angel who welcomes deceased dogs into Heaven. She was named "Annabelle" in the 1996 sequel and its subsequent syndicated television series.
 Bebe Neuwirth succeeded Moore in this role.  
 Ken Page as King Gator, an American alligator and voodoo witch doctor living below the streets of New Orleans.
 Rob Fuller and Earleen Carey as Kate and Harold, a married couple who later become Anne-Marie's adoptive parents.
 Godfrey Quigley as Terrier, a dog that appears when Itchy tells everyone Anne-Marie is in danger.
 Anna Manahan as Stella Dallas, a horse that appears when Anne-Marie, Charlie and Itchy are at the derby. She is against the Once Upon a Wintertime Team. 
 Candy Devine as Vera, a female gambling dog.

Production 
The earliest idea was conceived by Don Bluth after finishing work on The Secret of NIMH. The treatment was originally about a canine private eye, and one of three short stories, making up an anthology film. The character of a shaggy German Shepherd was designed specifically for Burt Reynolds. However, Bluth's first studio, Don Bluth Productions, was going through a period of financial difficulty, ultimately having to declare bankruptcy, and the idea never made it beyond rough storyboards. The concept was revived by Bluth, John Pomeroy and Gary Goldman, and rewritten by David N. Weiss, collaborating with the producers from October through December 1987. They built around the title All Dogs Go to Heaven and drew inspiration from films, such as It's a Wonderful Life, Little Miss Marker and A Guy Named Joe. The film's title came from a book read to Bluth's fourth-grade class, and he resisted suggestions to change it, stating he liked how "provocative" it sounded, and how people reacted to the title alone.

During the production of their previous feature film, Sullivan Bluth Studios had moved from Van Nuys, California, to a state-of-the-art studio facility in Dublin, Ireland, and the film was their first to begin production wholly at the Irish studio. It was also their first to be funded from sources outside of Hollywood, the previous two feature films, An American Tail and The Land Before Time, had been backed by Amblin Entertainment and Universal Pictures, and executive producers Steven Spielberg and George Lucas (for The Land Before Time only) exercised a degree of control over the content of the films, a situation Bluth found disagreeable. The studio found investment from UK-based Goldcrest Films in a US$70m deal to produce three animated feature films (though only two, Rock-a-Doodle and it, were completed under the deal). The three founding members of the studio, Bluth, Pomeroy, and Goldman, had all moved to Ireland to set up the new facility, but during the film's production, John Pomeroy returned to the U.S. to head up a satellite studio which provided some of the animation for the film. Pomeroy also used his presence in the U.S. to generate early publicity for the film, including a presentation at the 1987 San Diego Comic-Con.

The film's lead voices, Burt Reynolds and Dom DeLuise, had previously appeared together in five films. For this one, they requested them to record their parts in the studio together (in American animation, actors more commonly record their parts solo). Bluth agreed and allowed the duo to ad-lib extensively; Bluth later commented, "their ad-libs were often better than the original script". However, Reynolds was more complimentary of the draft, warmly quipping, "Great script, kid", as he left the studio. Another pair of voices, those of Carface and Killer (Vic Tayback and Charles Nelson Reilly, respectively), also recorded together. Loni Anderson, who voices Flo, was Reynolds' then-wife. Child actress Judith Barsi, who voiced Ducky in Bluth's previous film The Land Before Time, was selected to voice Anne-Marie; she was killed in an apparent murder-suicide over a year before All Dogs was released.

As production neared completion, the studio held test screenings and decided that some scenes were too intense for younger viewers. Pomeroy decided to shorten Charlie's nightmare about being condemned. Goldman also agreed to the cut, recognizing that the concession needed to be made in the name of commercial appeal. Bluth owned a private 35-mm print with the excised scenes and planned to convince Goldcrest on releasing a director's cut after returning from Ireland in the mid-1990s, but the print was eventually stolen from Bluth's locked storage room, diminishing hopes of this version being released on home media.

Music 

The music for All Dogs Go to Heaven was composed by Ralph Burns with lyrics by Charles Strouse, T.J. Kuenster, Joel Hirschhorn, and Al Kasha. An official soundtrack was released on July 1, 1989, by Curb Records on audio cassette and CD featuring 13 tracks, including seven vocal songs performed by various cast members. The track "Let Me Be Surprised" contains a swear word in a dialogue cut from the final product. "Love Survives", the end credits song and overall theme, was dedicated to Anne-Marie's voice actress Judith Barsi, who was shot by her father, József, along with her mother, Maria, before the film's release on July 25, 1988.

Songs 
Original songs performed in the film include:

Reception and legacy

Critical response 
All Dogs Go to Heaven received mostly mixed reviews, maintaining a 44% approval rating on Rotten Tomatoes based on 17 reviews, and a 50 out of 100 score from Metacritic. Reviewers often drew unfavorable comparisons to The Little Mermaid, criticizing the disjointed narrative, the quality of the animation, and the songs by Charlie Strouse and T.J. Kuenster. The film received a "thumbs down" from Gene Siskel and a "thumbs up" from Roger Ebert on a 1989 episode of their television program At the Movies. While Siskel found it to be "surprisingly weak" given director Don Bluth's previous works, due largely to its "confusing story" and "needlessly violent" scenes, Ebert was a huge fan of the movie's "rubbery and kind of flexible" animation, stating he felt it was a good film despite not being an "animated classic".

Some also found the darker subject material objectionable in a family film, given the film's depictions of death, violence, theft, drinking, smoking, gambling, murder, demons, and images of Hell. Other reviews were mostly positive, with critics praising the film's emotional qualities, humor, and vibrant color palette. Roger Ebert, who was unimpressed with Bluth's previous film An American Tail, gave it three out of four stars, remarking that the animation "permits such a voluptuous use of color that the movie is an invigorating bath for the eyes" and that although he preferred The Little Mermaid, which opened on the same day, he still found Dogs to be bright and inventive. However, film critic Leonard Maltin gave it one-and-a-half out of four stars, due to unappealing characters, confusing storytelling, and forgettable songs. Common Sense Media is concerned about the depictions of illegal drug usage and excessive thematic elements plotting in a family oriented movie.

Box office 
Dissatisfied with the terms imposed by Universal Pictures, which had distributed their previous two films, the studio found an alternative distributor in United Artists. Somewhat unusually, production investors Goldcrest Films covered the cost of the release prints and the promotional campaign, in return for a greatly reduced distribution fee from UA. This was similar to the arrangement with United Artists when they distributed Bluth's first feature film, The Secret of NIMH. Goldcrest Films invested $15 million in print and promotion. Due to contractual issues, very little tie-in merchandise accompanied the film's theatrical release; a computer game adaptation for the Commodore Amiga system (with a free software package) was released, and restaurant chain Wendy's offered toys with their Kids' Meals or regular fries.

The film opened in North America on November 17, 1989, concurrent with Disney's 28th full-length animated motion picture The Little Mermaid; once again, Sullivan Bluth would be vying for box-office receipts with Disney, just as their last two films (An American Tail and The Land Before Time) had. On its theatrical release, the film's performance fell short of the studio's previous box-office successes, grossing $27 million in North America alone, just over half of what An American Tail and The Land Before Time each took.

This would be Bluth's final box office hit until Anastasia was released eight years later in 1997, which ended up becoming his highest-grossing film.

Awards and honors 
All Dogs Go to Heaven received a nomination for "Best Family Motion Picture: Adventure or Cartoon" at the 11th Annual Youth in Film Awards ceremony, being beaten by Disney's The Little Mermaid. The home video release received an Award of Excellence from the Film Advisory Board.

Home media 
All Dogs Go to Heaven was released on VHS, S-VHS, 8mm video and LaserDisc in both regular and special CAV standard play editions by MGM/UA Home Video on August 28, 1990. The film became a sleeper hit due to its home video release; a strong promotional campaign helped it become one of the top-selling VHS releases of all time, selling over 3 million copies in its first month. The film was followed by another VHS release under the MGM/UA Family Entertainment label in 1994, which was available exclusively through Warner Home Video.

A DVD was made available for the first time on March 6, 2001, under the MGM Kids label and was later released as a double feature with All Dogs Go to Heaven 2 on March 14, 2006. On March 29, 2011, the film made its debut on Blu-ray, which was later included as a bundle with its sequel on October 7, 2014, along with a re-release of the compilation on DVD. The Blu-ray version was also packaged with another Don Bluth film, The Pebble and the Penguin, on October 8, 2013, and again with eight other MGM films as part of the company's 90th anniversary "Best of Family Collection" on February 4, 2014.

Legacy 
The success of the film, particularly its performance on home video, prompted several follow-up productions. A theatrical sequel, All Dogs Go to Heaven 2 (1996), a television series, All Dogs Go to Heaven: The Series (1996–1998), and An All Dogs Christmas Carol (1998), a Christmas television movie based on Charles Dickens' A Christmas Carol, were made. Bluth and his studio had no involvement with any of them, and Reynolds did not reprise his role as Charlie after the first film; he was replaced in the sequel film and television series by Charlie Sheen and Steven Weber, respectively. Reilly declined to return for the sequel film, but voiced Killer for the television productions. DeLuise played Itchy through the entire franchise.

See also 
 List of films about angels

References

Further reading

External links 

 
 
 
 
 
 
 All Dogs Go To Heaven Activity Center

 
1989 animated films
1989 films
1980s American animated films
1980s fantasy comedy-drama films
1980s musical comedy-drama films
American buddy comedy-drama films
American children's animated adventure films
American children's animated comedy films
American children's animated fantasy films
American children's animated musical films
American fantasy comedy-drama films
American musical comedy-drama films
Animated buddy films
Animated films about dogs
Animated films about friendship
Animated films about orphans
British animated fantasy films
British buddy comedy-drama films
British children's animated films
British children's fantasy films
British fantasy adventure films
British musical comedy-drama films
Films about angels
Films about the afterlife
Films adapted into television shows
Films directed by Don Bluth
Films directed by Gary Goldman
Films directed by Dan Kuenster
Films set in 1939
Films set in New Orleans
Goldcrest Films films
Heaven and hell films
English-language Irish films
Irish animated fantasy films
Irish musical comedy-drama films
Mardi Gras in New Orleans
Films produced by Don Bluth and Gary Goldman
Films produced by John Pomeroy
Films with screenplays by Don Bluth
Films with screenplays by Gary Goldman
Films with screenplays by John Pomeroy
Films with screenplays by David N. Weiss
Rotoscoped films
Southern Gothic films
Sullivan Bluth Studios films
United Artists animated films
United Artists films
Dogs in religion
1980s children's animated films
1989 directorial debut films
1989 comedy films
1989 drama films
1980s English-language films
1980s buddy comedy-drama films
1980s British films
Films set in the 1930s
American independent films
British independent films
Irish independent films